Amin Manouchehri (born February 6, 1986) is an Iranian footballer who last played for Saipa in the Persian Gulf Pro League.

Club career
Manouchehri started his professional playing career with Saipa. After several good seasons at Saipa he caught the eye of Tehran Giants, Esteghlal. On June 6, 2012, he joined the Persian Gulf Pro League giants Esteghlal on a two-year contract, but he was released at the winter transfer window. He then joined Naft Tehran and played until the end of the season for the club. He joined to Rah Ahan for the 2013–14 season on loan from Naft Tehran. Before the start of 2015–15 season, Manouchehri has accepted the permanent move to Rah Ahan by signing a three-year contract with the club.

Sepahan
Manouchehri joined Sepahan midway through the 2015–16 season. On 28 April 2016 Manouchehri scored in a 2–1 victory over Gostaresh Foolad.

Club career statistics

 Assist Goals

Honours
Saipa
Iran Pro League (1): 2006–07

References

Amin Manouchheri at Navad

1986 births
Living people
Iranian footballers
Saipa F.C. players
Esteghlal F.C. players
Persian Gulf Pro League players
Association football forwards